Smallbridge is a district of Rochdale in Greater Manchester, England. It lies at the foothills of the Pennines, in the northeast of Rochdale, contiguous with Buckley, and to the south of the village of Wardle. The Rochdale ward is called Smallbridge and Firgrove. This ward had a population of 11,469 at the 2011 Census.

See also

Listed buildings in Wardle, Greater Manchester

References

External links
Wardle and Smallbridge History Group Home page of the local history group

Areas of Rochdale